Urszula Piwnicka, née Jasińska (born 6 December 1983 in Pasłęk) is a javelin thrower from Poland. Her personal best throw is 62.34 metres, achieved in May 2007 in Sopot.

Achievements

References
 

1983 births
Living people
People from Pasłęk
Polish female javelin throwers
Athletes (track and field) at the 2008 Summer Olympics
Olympic athletes of Poland
Sportspeople from Warmian-Masurian Voivodeship
Universiade medalists in athletics (track and field)
Universiade bronze medalists for Poland
21st-century Polish women